XHLL-FM is a radio station on 90.1 FM in Boca del Río, Veracruz. It is owned by Grupo Pazos Radio and carries an adult contemporary format known as Fusión.

History
XELL-AM 1430 received its first concession on August 23, 1946, signing on October 20. It was owned by Dolores G. Ferreira and broadcast with 250 watts. On March 14, 1951, XELL was sold to Carlos Ferráez Matos, and two years later, Julio César Orozco y García bought the station.

By the 1960s, it had increased its daytime power to 5,000 watts. 1967 saw the acquisition of XELL by Esperanza Navarro de Núñez, who promptly transferred it to Radio Jarocha in 1968. XELL's power revised back down in the 1980s to 500, but in the 2000s it was raised to 5,000 watts day and 1,000 night.

In 2010, XELL was cleared for AM-FM migration.

References

Radio stations in Veracruz
Radio stations established in 1946